The Ashchykol Depression, is a depression in the Turkistan and Kyzylorda regions, Kazakhstan.

The village of Taykonyr, Suzak District, Turkistan Region is located in the depression. The Ashchykol zone includes a  Important Bird Area.

Geography
The Ashchykol Depression lies between the lowest reaches of the Sarysu in the west and the mouth of the Chu river in the east.

It is a largely flat endorheic basin filled with mixed sand and clay deposits, as well as sandy alluvial sediments. There are numerous intermittent salt lakes and sors. The main lakes are Akzhaikyn and Ashchykol. In wet years the Chu river may reach lake Akzhaikyn at the eastern end and the Boktykaryn the Ashchykol lake. At the western end the Sarysu river usually ends in the Telikol lake. The latter is located between the western limit of the Ashchykol Depression and the Daryaly takir plain further to the west.

Flora 
Reeds and sedges may grow in marshy areas and lake shores. Wormwood, winterfat, Aeluropus and saltwort grow sparsely in the land areas in between.

See also 
 Geology of Kazakhstan

References

External links

Depressions of Kazakhstan
Turkistan Region
Kyzylorda Region
Chu (river)